Rastelli is an Italian surname. Notable people with the surname include:

Ellis Rastelli (born 1975), Italian cyclist
Enrico Rastelli (1896–1931), Italian juggler, acrobat and performer
Giancarlo Rastelli (1934–1970), Italian cardiac surgeon
Rastelli procedure, an open heart surgical procedure
Maicol Rastelli (born 1991), Italian cross-country skier
Massimo Rastelli (born 1968), Italian footballer and manager
Philip Rastelli (1918–1991), American mobster

Italian-language surnames